Limbobotys is a genus of moths of the family Crambidae.

Species
Limbobotys acanthi Zhang & Li, 2013
Limbobotys foochowensis Munroe & Mutuura, 1970
Limbobotys hainanensis Munroe & Mutuura, 1970
Limbobotys limbolalis (Moore, 1877)
Limbobotys ptyophora (Hampson, 1896)

References

Pyraustinae
Crambidae genera
Taxa named by Eugene G. Munroe